Eric de Leon Olivarez is an educator, a registered nurse, and a fitness buff who is the incumbent Mayor of Parañaque since 2022. He previously served as a councilor and representative of the city's first district.

Education
Olivarez earned his Bachelor of Science in Nursing degree at the California State University in Los Angeles and subsequently passed the Philippine Nurse Licensure Examination. He later earned his Bachelor of Arts in History and Political Science, Master in Science degree major in Educational Management, and Doctor of Education major in Educational Management at De La Salle University, respectively.

Career

Educator 
Olivarez became a commissioner and accreditor at the Philippine Association of Colleges and Universities – Commission on Accreditation (PACUCOA, Inc.) and a member of the Regional Quality Assessment Team of the Commission on Higher Education in the National Capital Region. He also served as Vice President for Academics and Services at Olivarez College in Parañaque and as a graduate school assistant professor lecturer at the De La Salle University College of Education.

Politics 
Olivarez entered politics in 2007, when he ran for a seat in the Parañaque City Council and served for six years before seeking the city’s 1st district congressional seat in 2013. He served as a congressman for three terms until 2022, when he ran and won as mayor.

Personal life 
He is married to Aileen Claire Olivarez and has two sons.

References 

Living people
21st-century Filipino politicians
Mayors of Parañaque
PDP–Laban politicians
Liberal Party (Philippines) politicians
Filipino educators
Filipino nurses
California State University alumni
De La Salle University alumni
Academic staff of De La Salle University
1970 births